Frank Doyle (born September 8, 1980) is a Canadian former professional ice hockey goaltender. Doyle spent his career in the North American leagues before moving to Europe to play. He last played with the Sheffield Steelers in 2015.

Playing career
Born in Guelph, Ontario, Canada, Doyle played two seasons with the University of Maine before turning professional in 2004–05 with the Idaho Steelheads of the ECHL. He played in the ECHL All-Star Game that season, and was named Most Valuable Player of the game. He also played in one game with the Utah Grizzlies of the AHL in 2004–05. He was signed as a free agent by New Jersey on August 15, 2005, and joined their former AHL affiliate, the Albany River Rats, in 2005–06. On September 1, 2008, he signed with Kölner Haie.

References

External links

1980 births
Living people
Albany River Rats players
Canadian ice hockey goaltenders
Ice hockey people from Ontario
Idaho Steelheads (ECHL) players
Kölner Haie players
Lowell Devils players
Maine Black Bears men's ice hockey players
SHC Fassa players
Utah Grizzlies (AHL) players
Sportspeople from Guelph
Canadian expatriate ice hockey players in Italy
Canadian expatriate ice hockey players in Germany